Dato' Abdul Rahman bin Hassan (30 July 1946 – 13 June 2019) was a Malaysian singer. He won the Music Industry Leadership Award in the Papuita Kecapi Award 2006.

From 1970 to 2013, he was married to singer Azizah binti Mohamad. After his first wife died in 2013, he married actress Fadilah Mansor on 25 December 2014.

Death
Rahman been hospitalized on 1 June 2019 from complications of a stroke, and died shortly after midnight on 13 June. According to Khir Rahman, his father's body will be taken to the family's residence at Taman Sri Ukay before being buried after Zuhur at Taman Keramat's Cemetery.

Discography

Songs
 Bimbang
 Cincin Belah Rotan
 Hanya Untukku
 Perpaduan Hidup
 Semoga Berjaya
 Usah di kesalkan - lirik & lagu: Dato’ A Rahman Hassan
 Nasib pak tani - lirik & lagu: Dato’ A Rahman Hassan
 Syurga idaman - lagu: Dato’ A Rahman Hassan & lirik: Ali Omar
 Tak mengapa - lirik & lagu: Dato’ A Rahman Hassan
 Mestikah - lirik & lagu: Dato’ A Rahman Hassan
 Kerana Fitnah - lagu: MYRosnah & lirik: Dato’ A Rahman Hassan
 Pergilah kanda ku - lagu: Dato’ A Rahman Hassan & lirik: Ali Omar
 Nikmat yang tak ternilai - lirik & lagu: Dato’ A Rahman Hassan

Awards and nominations 
 Music Industry Leadership Award (Papuita Kecapi Award 2006).

References

1946 births
20th-century Malaysian male singers
2019 deaths
Malaysian people of Malay descent
Malaysian Muslims
21st-century Malaysian male singers